Holly Wood is a  biological Site of Special Scientific Interest north-east of Oxford in Oxfordshire.

This ancient wood is a small remnant of the medieval Royal Forest of Shotover. It is coppice with standards on Oxford Clay with a varied invertebrate fauna. There are several uncommon butterfiles such as the black hairstreak and  purple emperor.

References

 
Sites of Special Scientific Interest in Oxfordshire